Seo Kyoko (born 28 June 1972) is a Japanese gymnast. She competed in five events at the 1992 Summer Olympics.

References

External links
 

1972 births
Living people
Japanese female artistic gymnasts
Olympic gymnasts of Japan
Gymnasts at the 1992 Summer Olympics
Sportspeople from Yamagata Prefecture
Asian Games medalists in gymnastics
Gymnasts at the 1990 Asian Games
Asian Games gold medalists for Japan
Medalists at the 1990 Asian Games
20th-century Japanese women